The Naya-Micay Fault is a dextral oblique thrust fault in the departments of Cauca and Valle del Cauca in Colombia.

Etymology 
The fault is named after the Naya and Micay Rivers.

Description 
The Naya-Micay Fault runs parallel to and inland of the southwestern Pacific Coast of Colombia in the Cauca and Valle del Cauca departments from Guapi in the south to Buenaventura in the north. The fault displaces marine and non-marine Pliocene sedimentary rocks. It locally offsets undifferentiated Quaternary alluvial deposits. In general, there are uplifted Tertiary sediments on the east and Quaternary sediments on the western side of the fault. The fault appears to be a northern continuation of the Remolino-El Charco Fault. The fault controls drainage of the Guapi River, locally offsets Quaternary deposits, and forms folded paleosoils, elongated basins and ridges and has strong general linear features. Along the coast, it forms typical fault-controlled linear landforms.

See also 

 List of earthquakes in Colombia
 Romeral Fault System
 Malpelo Plate

References

Bibliography

Maps 
 

Seismic faults of Colombia
Thrust faults
Strike-slip faults
Inactive faults
Faults
Faults